Patrick Pilet (born October 8, 1981) is a French professional racing driver. He has competed in major sports car endurance races like the 24 Hours of Le Mans, 24 Hours of Daytona, 24 Hours of Spa, 12 Hours of Sebring and Petit Le Mans.

Born in Auch, Gers, Pilet won the Championnat de France Formula Renault 2.0 in 2004 and competed at the Formula Renault 2000 Eurocup. In 2005 he switched to Formula Renault 3.5 Series, finishing 11th having missed three rounds. He drove full-time in Formula Renault 3.5 in 2006, but he finished 21st.

Pilet switched to sports car racing in 2007, and was crowned Porsche Carrera Cup France champion with IMSA Performance.

In 2009 and 2010 he raced full-time for IMSA Performance at the International GT Open together with Raymond Narac in a Super GT class Porsche 911. He finished 5th in 2009 with 6 wins in 16 races and 7th in 2010 with 4 wins in 16 races. He finished second at the 24 Hours of Spa, also in an IMSA Performance Porsche with Narac, Patrick Long and Richard Lietz.

He drove for Team Art Taste, a new Japanese Super GT team using Porsche 911 GT3R, in 2011 Super GT season. Also, he raced full-time for IMSA Performance at the Le Mans Series, again with Porsche with Wolf Henzler as partner, collecting one podium.

In 2020 Patrick would drive for Porsche GT Team from America, but due Covid 19 the team decided not to travel to Le Mans. Because of a crash of the IDEC car of Paul Lafargue which caused an injury, the team needed a new driver. Because Patrick was a reserve driver for Porsche he was already in the mandatory bubble, he stepped in the IDEC Oreca 07.

Racing record

Career summary

Complete Formula Renault 3.5 Series results 
(key) (Races in bold indicate pole position) (Races in italics indicate fastest lap)

† Driver did not finish the race, but was classified as he completed more than 90% of the race distance.

Complete 24 Hours of Le Mans results

Complete FIA World Endurance Championship results

Complete European Le Mans Series results
(key) (Races in bold indicate pole position; results in italics indicate fastest lap)

Complete WeatherTech SportsCar Championship results
(key) (Races in bold indicate pole position; results in italics indicate fastest lap)

References

External links
 
 

1981 births
Living people
People from Auch
French racing drivers
Italian Formula Renault 1.6 drivers
Belgian Formula Renault 1.6 drivers
French Formula Renault 2.0 drivers
Formula Renault Eurocup drivers
American Le Mans Series drivers
24 Hours of Le Mans drivers
FIA GT Championship drivers
European Le Mans Series drivers
World Series Formula V8 3.5 drivers
24 Hours of Daytona drivers
Rolex Sports Car Series drivers
FIA World Endurance Championship drivers
International GT Open drivers
Blancpain Endurance Series drivers
WeatherTech SportsCar Championship drivers
24 Hours of Spa drivers
Sportspeople from Gers
Porsche Motorsports drivers
Graff Racing drivers
Jenzer Motorsport drivers
Tech 1 Racing drivers
KCMG drivers
Rowe Racing drivers
Nürburgring 24 Hours drivers
24H Series drivers